Irish pop vocal group Westlife have released twelve studio albums, sixteen video albums, one live album, three karaoke albums, thirty-eight singles, twenty-one promotional singles, nine compilation albums and fifty-four music videos. Formed on 3 July 1998, the group was made up of singers Nicky Byrne, Kian Egan, Mark Feehily, Shane Filan, and Brian McFadden (who quit the band on 9 March 2004). The band was signed under Simon Cowell, Clive Davis, and Jordan Jay and under record labels' BMG, S Records, Arista Records, Sony BMG, Syco Music, Sony Music Entertainment and RCA Records from 1998 to 2012 and currently on Universal Music Group and Virgin EMI Records from 2018. The last four members remained active until their last live concert performance in the Europe's third largest stadium Croke Park on 23 June 2012 and have reunited on 3 October 2018 for new music and tour. Based on the British Phonographic Industry certifications, the group have sold more than 26 million records and videos in the United Kingdom alone across their 20-year career–12.8 million singles, 13.5 million albums and 1.3 million videos. Their biggest selling album is their first Greatest Hits compilation, followed by Coast to Coast, with seven of their albums selling one million copies or more. Their biggest selling video is "Where Dreams Come True", which has sold 240,000 copies to date.

In 2012, the Official Charts Company listed Westlife 34th amongst the biggest-selling singles artists in British music history. They are currently the sixteenth overall biggest group of all time. As of April 2018, the group has sold more than 55 million records worldwide.

They accumulated a total of 26 top ten hits including 16 number one singles as lead artist and as featured artist, 8 number one albums and 13 top 5 albums in the United Kingdom alone. 20 out of 29 singles as lead artist and as featured artist they have released in the United Kingdom have certifications from 1999 to 2022. They are also currently ranked twenty-fourth with most number ones albums of all time. They have had 36 number-one albums worldwide. This earned them the following Guinness World Records: first to achieve seven consecutive number-one singles in the UK, most singles to debut at number one on the UK chart and top selling album group in the United Kingdom in the 21st century. Despite their success, Westlife never managed to break into the United States, achieving only one hit single in 2000, their debut single "Swear It Again", which peaked at number 20 on Billboard Hot 100 and was certified Gold.

However, "Swear It Again" was the band's first number-one single in the United Kingdom and Ireland followed by seventeen more number-ones from their succeeding singles "If I Let You Go", "Flying Without Wings", "I Have A Dream/Seasons in the Sun", "Fool Again", "Against All Odds (Take a Look at Me Now)", "My Love", "Uptown Girl", "Queen of My Heart"/"When You're Looking Like That", "World of Our Own", "Unbreakable", "Tonight"/"Miss You Nights", "Mandy", "Everybody Hurts", "You Raise Me Up", "The Rose", "Hello My Love", and "Dynamite" from 1999 to 2019.

The group's debut international self-titled studio album, Westlife (1999) was number-one in several countries which was followed by succeeding studio albums Coast to Coast (2000), World of Our Own (2001), Unbreakable - The Greatest Hits Vol. 1 (2002) and Turnaround (2003), which continued the group's success worldwide. The four remaining member continued as a group to release their cover albums Allow Us to Be Frank (2004) and The Love Album (2006) and the studio albums Face to Face (2005) and Back Home (2007). After a one-year hiatus in 2008, they regrouped and released studio albums Where We Are (2009), and Gravity (2010) and compilation album Greatest Hits (2011). After eight years, the group reformed and released Spectrum (2019), followed by Wild Dreams (2021).

Albums

Studio albums

Compilation albums

Compilation albums (Limited release)

Live albums

Singles

As lead artist

As a featured artist

Promotional singles

Other charted songs

Soundtrack appearances

Videography

Documentaries

Concert tours

Music video compilations, audio and video albums or singles

Music videos

Notes
 The "If I Let You Go" (Extended Mix), "Evergreen" and "Bop Bop Baby" (Almighty Mix Radio Edit) music videos were exclusively released by a music channel (Myx) in the Philippines.
 The music video for "My Private Movie" was released in Asia only.

Cameo appearance
Vengaboys – "Forever as One" (2001)

See also
List of songs recorded by Westlife
List of best-selling boy bands
UK Singles Chart records and statistics
List of artists who reached number one on the UK Singles Chart
List of best-selling music artists in the United Kingdom in singles sales
List of artists by number of UK Singles Chart number ones
List of UK Singles Downloads Chart number ones of the 2000s
List of UK Singles Chart number ones of the 2000s
List of UK Albums Chart number ones of the 2000s
List of artists who reached number one in Ireland
List of songs that reached number one on the Irish Singles Chart
List of best-selling albums in the Philippines

Footnotes

References

External links
Official Westlife website

Discography
Pop music group discographies
Discographies of Irish artists